Tania Davis (born 4 July 1975) is the first violinist of the British/Australian classical crossover string quartet Bond. Originally the violist of the quartet, she became the first violinist of the group in 2008 when its original first violinist Haylie Ecker left the group. Elspeth Hanson subsequently joined the group in 2008 as the violist. Davis was educated at SCEGGS Darlinghurst in Sydney before acquiring a first-class Bachelor of Music honors degree from the Sydney Conservatorium of Music and then moving on to gain a postgraduate diploma in performance with distinction from the Guildhall School of Music and Drama in London. Her experience includes playing with the Australian Chamber Orchestra, the Sydney Symphony and the London Symphony Orchestra.

Pieces which Davis has written include "Odyssey", and pieces that she has arranged include "Señorita". She has 3 children, named Lukas Davis, Hugo Davis and Freya Davis.

References

External links 
 Bond Official Website

1975 births
Living people
Alumni of the Guildhall School of Music and Drama
Australian classical violists
Women violists
Musicians from Sydney
Bond (band) members
People educated at Sydney Church of England Girls Grammar School
Australian expatriates in England